"Standing Strong" is a song by Australian recording artist Wendy Matthews. It was released in September 1994 as the lead single from her third studio album, The Witness Tree. The song peaked at number 37 on the Australian charts.

At the APRA Music Awards of 1995, the song won Most Performed Australian Work.

Track listing
 "Standing Strong" - 4:56
 "Waiting in Vain" (live) - 5:28
 "Iroquois Lullaby" (live) - 2:59

Charts

References

1994 singles
1994 songs
Wendy Matthews songs
APRA Award winners